Russell Lindsay Barrett (born 1977) is an Australian botanist.

Names published 
(incomplete list of the 129 published names)
Typhonium peltandroides Nuytsia, 13(1): 243 (1999)
Gahnia halmaturina R.L.Barrett & K.L.Wilson Journal Adelaide Botanical Garden (2012)
Acacia anastomosa Maslin, M.D.Barrett & R.L.Barrett, Nuytsia 23: 545 (2013).
Anthelepis R.L.Barrett, K.L.Wilson & J.J.Bruhl, Austral. Syst. Bot. 32(4): 276 (2019).
(These may not be accepted names.)

Publications 
(incomplete)

See also
 https://www.theplantpress.com/

References 

21st-century Australian botanists
Living people
1977 births